Actinobacillus seminis is a Gram-negative bacterium associated with epididymitis of sheep.

References

Further reading
Núñez-del Arco, Alma, et al. "Identification of an immunogenic protein of Actinobacillus seminis that is present in microvesicles." Canadian journal of veterinary research 70.1 (2006): 43.

External links

LPSN
NSWDPI
Type strain of Actinobacillus seminis at BacDive -  the Bacterial Diversity Metadatabase

Pasteurellales
Bacteria described in 1990